Mike Shalin (1954 - December 4, 2020) was a sportswriter known for covering the New York Yankees and the Boston Red Sox from 1980 to 2005 and being the Red Sox official scorer at Fenway Park since 2005. He was 66.

Shalin wrote for both the New York Post  in the 1980s and the Boston Herald from 1983 to 1995, bridging "the New York/Boston divide." Before writing for the New York Post, Shalin wrote for United Press International in the 1970s. His first sportswriting was covering hockey games, he wrote Tales from the New York Rangers Locker Room about the experience in 2016. Shalin wrote a regular column for the New Hampshire Union Leader called Working Press on Sundays and weekdays.

Shalin was an eligible voter at the Baseball Hall of Fame. He wrote a book with his brother Neil about players they believed should have been in the Hall of Fame but weren't called Out by a Step: The 100 Best Players Not in the Baseball Hall of Fame.

Personal life
Shalin was married to his wife Mary and the couple had three sons.

Bibliography
 Mo Vaughn: Angel on a Mission (1999)  
 Drew Bledsoe: Patriot Rifle (1999)  
 Nomar Garciaparra: High 5! (1999)  
 Pedro Martinez: throwing strikes (1999)  
 Out by a Step: The 100 Best Players Not in the Baseball Hall of Fame (2002)  
 Donnie Baseball: The Definitive Biography of Don Mattingly (2011)  
 They Call Me Oil Can: Baseball, Drugs, and Life on the Edge (2012)  
 Alex Rodriguez: A+ Shortstop (2012)  
 Tales from the New York Rangers Locker Room: A Collection of The Greatest Rangers Stories Ever Told (2016, with Gilles Villemure)  
 The Hometown Team: Four Decades of Boston Red Sox Photography (2018)

References

1954 births
2020 deaths
American sports journalists